Sílvia Escobar Pfeifer (born February 24, 1958) is a Brazilian actress and former model.

Career 

In television she began in 1990, for Rede Globo, acting in the telenovela Meu Bem, Meu Mal. In 1992, she made Perigosas Peruas. In 1994 Tropicaliente. In 1996: O Rei do Gado and Malhação. In 1998: Torre de Babel. In 2000: Uga, Uga. In 2001: O Clone. In 2002: Desejos de Mulher. In 2003: Kubanacan and Celebridade. In 2006, Pé na Jaca.

The actress Sílvia Pfeifer also made several miniseries, specials and series. In 1990, Boca do Lixo. In 1998: Você Decide. In 2002, Os Normais. In 2004: Linha Direta. In 2006: A Diarista. In 2008: Casos e Acasos.

In 2009, she moved to TV Record, where she worked on the telenovela Bela, a Feia.

In film, Sílvia acted in 1991's Não Quero Falar Sobre Isso Agora. In 2000, Le Voyeur a short film and Xuxa Popstar. In 2004: A Cartomante.

In 2016, she was hired by TVI.

Personal life 
She is married to businessman Nelson Chamma Filho, with whom she has two children, Emanuela and Nicholas.

Filmography

Television

Movies

References

External links 

1958 births
Living people
People from Porto Alegre
Brazilian female models
Brazilian telenovela actresses
Brazilian film actresses
Brazilian stage actresses